Guajará (Guanjeras) is a municipality located in the Brazilian state of Amazonas. Its population was 16,937 in 2020 and its area is 8,904 km².

References

Municipalities in Amazonas (Brazilian state)